Pleurochrysis is a genus of haptophytes. It includes the species Pleurochrysis carterae, Pleurochrysis dentata, Pleurochrysis elongata, Pleurochrysis gayraliae, Pleurochrysis haptonemofera, Pleurochrysis placolithoides, Pleurochrysis pseudoroscoffensis, Pleurochrysis roscoffensis and Pleurochrysis scherffelii.

References

Haptophyte genera